Zellerminia is a genus of moths of the family Noctuidae.

Species
Zellerminia zelleralis (Wocke, 1850)

References
Natural History Museum Lepidoptera genus database

Herminiinae